2nd Wind is the thirteenth album by  American musician Todd Rundgren, released in 1991 on Warner Bros. Records. It reached number 118 on the Billboard 200 album chart. 2nd Wind includes the single "Change Myself" and was Rundgren's final album on a major label until 2004's Liars.

Background
As with its predecessor, Nearly Human, Rundgren chose to record the album with a full band, as opposed to playing all of the instruments himself. The album was recorded live in front of an audience at the Palace of Fine Arts in San Francisco, California, over the course of a week.

The album includes three songs ("The Smell of Money", "If I Have to Be Alone" and "Love in Disguise") written for Rundgren's musical version of the Joe Orton play/screenplay Up Against It. "Gaya's Eyes"  continues the new, more mature sound introduced on the preceding album Nearly Human.

Rundgren used the video for the album's only single, "Change Myself," as a showcase for the NewTek Video Toaster, a desktop video card for the Commodore Amiga computer.

Releases
Promotional DJ issues of the CD have a black, gold and blue swirl on the CD label where the stock releases have a blue and yellow swirl. There was also a vinyl release of the album in Europe which is nearly impossible to find.

After the album had been out of print for several years, Friday Music released a remastered version in October 2008, the first release in what the company called the "Todd Rundgren Remaster Series", although the follow up remastered release of Nearly Human didn't arrive until 2021.

In 2002, Image Entertainment released a DVD entitled The 2nd Wind Recording Sessions, which detailed the making of the album, and featured interviews with Rundgren as well as band members and fans. Also included with the video was The Desktop Collection, a compilation of Rundgren's Video Toaster-powered music videos, including "Change Myself."

Track listing
All songs written by Todd Rundgren.

Personnel 
 Todd Rundgren – vocals, guitar
 Roger Powell – keyboards and vocals
 Vince Welnick – keyboards and vocals
 Ross Valory – bass
 Lyle Workman – guitar
 Prairie Prince – drums
 Max Haskett – brass and vocals
 Bobby Strickland – reeds, winds and vocals
 Scott Mathews – percussion, guitar, samples and vocals
 Shandi Sinnamon – vocals
 Michele Gray – vocals
 Jenni Muldaur – vocals

References

1991 albums
Todd Rundgren albums
Warner Records albums